A swan is a bird of the genus Cygnus (true swans) or Coscoroba (coscoroba swans).

Swan, swans, or The Swan may also refer to:

Arts, entertainment, and media

Film and television
 The Swan (1925 film), a 1925 silent film
 The Swan (1956 film), a 1956 remake of a 1925 film of the same title
 Swan (1976 film), a Bulgarian drama film
 Swan, a television ident for BBC Two first aired in early 1998, see BBC Two '1991–2001' idents
 The Swan (TV series), a U.S. reality TV series from 2004
 Swan (2011 film), a Portuguese film directed by Teresa Villaverde

Literature
 Swan (manga), a shōjo manga by Ariyoshi Kyoko
 "The Swan" (Baudelaire), a poem by Baudelaire
 The Swan (newspaper), a student newspaper of St. Hugh's College, Oxford
 The Swan (novel), an English translation edition of 1991 novel by Guðbergur Bergsson
 "The Swan" (short story), a 1977 story by Roald Dahl
 The Swan, a 1920 play by Ferenc Molnár
 The Swan, a 1993 play by Elizabeth Egloff
Trumpet of the Swan by EB White

Music and dance
 Swans (band), an experimental rock group
 Swans (EP), an 1982 EP by the band Swans
 Swan (album), a 2011 album by Unwritten Law
 The Swan (ballet), better known as The Dying Swan
 Le Cygne (Saint-Saëns), a movement of the musical suite The Carnival of the Animals

Organisations
 Swan (rolling papers), a subsidiary of Swedish Match
 Swans (eyewear), a Japanese eyewear brand
 Swan Electronics, a radio gear manufacturer
 Swan Records (jazz label)
 Swan Records, a pop record label
 Shuang Wen Academy Network, of Shuang Wen School, New York City, US; see Association of Chinese Schools

People
 Howard E. Johnson (1908–1991), American swing alto saxophonist, nicknamed Swan
 Joseph Swan (1828—1914), English physicist, chemist, and inventor (most notably of the filament lightbulb)
 Howard Swan (1906–1995), American choral conductor and music educator
 Swan (surname), a list of people with the name
 Swan Hennessy (1866–1929), Irish-American composer based in Paris
 Swan King (1845–1886), nickname for Ludwig II of Bavaria
 Swan of Stowe, nickname for the Catholic saint Hugh of Lincoln
 Bunny Swan, Chinese character on Madtv played by Alex Borstein

Places
 Swan River (disambiguation)
 Swan Township (disambiguation)
 Swan Valley (disambiguation)

Australia
 City of Swan, Perth
 Division of Swan, an electoral district based on the surrounding area
 Swan Bay, Port Phillip, Victoria, Australia
 Swan Hill, Victoria, Australia

United States
 Swan, Indiana
 Swan, Iowa
 Swan, Missouri
 Swan Range, a mountain range in Montana
 Swan, Texas
 Swan, Wisconsin
 Swan Township, Holt County, Nebraska
 Swan's Island, Maine

In space
 Comet SWAN (disambiguation), the name of several comets
 Cygnus (constellation), a constellation also known as the Swan

Elsewhere
 The Swan, County Laois, Ireland
 Erasmusbrug, a bridge nicknamed "The Swan" in Rotterdam, Netherlands
 Swans, Punjab, Pakistan

Science and technology
 Swan's theorem, a concept in mathematics
 Solar Wind Anisotropies, an instrument of the Solar and Heliospheric Observatory spacecraft
 Syndrome without a name, a term indicating an unknown idiopathic disease
 Swan (nuclear primary), a prototype thermonuclear primary

Computing
 Scottish Wide Area Network (SWAN), the secure network for Scotland’s public services
 State Wide Area Network, in the National e-Governance Plan of India

Ships and boats
 HMAS Swan, several Royal Australian Navy ships
 HMS Swan, several British Royal Navy ships
 Nautor's Swan, a line of Finnish luxury sailing yachts
 Swan boat (racing), a long and narrow human-powered boat
 Swan Boats (Boston, Massachusetts), a fleet of pleasure boats
 Swan Boats (Magic Kingdom), a ride at the Magic Kingdom, Walt Disney World, (1973–1983)
 Swan Hellenic, a cruise line
 Swan (sternwheeler),  a stern-wheel steamboat
 USS Swan, several United States Navy ships

Sports
 Swan Districts Football Club, an Australian rules football club based in Bassendean, Australia
 Swan Racing, a NASCAR racing team
 Swan United FC, a football club based in Swan Valley, Australia
 Sydney Swans, an Australian rules football club

Venues

England
 Swan Theatre, Stratford-upon-Avon, England, a theatre belonging to the Royal Shakespeare Company
 Wycombe Swan, a theatre in High Wycombe
 The Swan (theatre), in London
 The Swan, Hammersmith, a public house in London
 The Swan, Little Totham, a pub in Little Totham, Essex, England
 The Swan, West Wycombe, a public house in Buckinghamshire
 The Swan, York, a pub in York
 The Swan (Tetsworth inn), an historic Elizabethan coaching inn in Tetsworth

Other venues
 Walt Disney World Swan, a US resort hotel

Other uses
 Swan (beer), a beer label, Western Australia
 Swan (chair), designed in 1958 by Arne jacobsen
 Swan (Dungeons & Dragons)
 Swan (Exalted), a role-playing game published by White Wolf Publishing
 Swan (Fabergé egg), commissioned in 1906 by Tsar Nicholas II
 Swan Bells, a set of bells in Perth, Australia
 Swan diagram, an economics model
 Swan Soap, a brand of soap introduced by the Lever Brothers Company
 SwanCon, a science fiction convention

See also

 Coscoroba swan, a relative of true swans
 Swan goose, a type of goose
 Swan mussel, a type of mollusk
 Swann (disambiguation)
 Wild Swans (disambiguation)
 Cygnus (disambiguation)